Ean Pisey (born 11 March 2002) is a Cambodian footballer currently playing as a midfielder for Preah Khan Reach Svay Rieng  in the Cambodian Premier League, and the Cambodia national team.

References

External links
 

2002 births
Living people
Cambodian footballers
Cambodia international footballers
People from Kandal province
Association football wingers
Competitors at the 2021 Southeast Asian Games
Southeast Asian Games competitors for Cambodia